Walter Nowotny (7 December 1920 – 8 November 1944) was an Austrian-born fighter ace of the Luftwaffe in World War II. He is credited with 258 aerial victories—that is, 258 aerial combat encounters resulting in the destruction of the enemy aircraft—in 442 combat missions. Nowotny achieved 255 of these victories on the Eastern Front and three while flying one of the first jet fighters, the Messerschmitt Me 262, in the Defense of the Reich. He scored most of his victories in the Focke-Wulf Fw 190, and approximately 50 in the Messerschmitt Bf 109.

List of aerial victories claimed
According to Spick, Nowotny is credited with 258 aerial victories claimed in 442 combat missions. Nowotny achieved 255 of these victories on the Eastern Front and three while flying one of the first jet fighters, the Messerschmitt Me 262, in the Defense of the Reich. Mathews and Foreman, authors of Luftwaffe Aces — Biographies and Victory Claims, researched the German Federal Archives and found records for 256 aerial victory claims, plus four further unconfirmed claims. This figure of confirmed claims includes 255 aerial victories on the Eastern Front and one victory on the Western Front flying the Me 262 jet fighter.

Victory claims were logged to a map-reference (PQ = Planquadrat), for example "PQ 35 Ost 19672". These sectors were then subdivided into 36 smaller units to give a location area 3 × 4 km in size.

Notes

References

Citations

Bibliography

 
 
 
 
 
 
 
 
 

Aerial victories of Nowotny, Walter
Nowotny, Walter
Aviation in World War II